The UEFA Euro 2000 finals tournament took place in Belgium and the Netherlands between 10 June and 2 July 2000. The sixteen nations that qualified were required to name a squad of 22 players for the tournament by 1 June 2000. The ages listed are the players' ages on the tournament's opening day (10 June 2000).

Group A

England
Manager: Kevin Keegan

England named a 28-man preliminary squad on 16 May 2000. Jamie Redknapp and Ray Parlour were both ruled out of the tournament due to respective knee injuries, while Andy Cole missed out because of a persistent toe injury. Keegan announced his final 22-man squad on 1 June with David James, Rio Ferdinand and Kieron Dyer also missing out.

Germany
Manager: Erich Ribbeck

Portugal
Manager: Humberto Coelho

Romania
Manager: Emerich Jenei

Group B

Belgium
Manager: Robert Waseige

Italy
Manager: Dino Zoff

Italy named an initial 26-man squad for the tournament on 18 May 2000. Midfielders Dino Baggio and Diego Fuser, and defender Giuseppe Pancaro did not make the cut for the final 22, while forward Christian Vieri was ruled out through injury. Goalkeeper Gianluigi Buffon was originally named in the final 22, but suffered a broken hand in a warm-up friendly against Norway on 3 June 2000; he was replaced in the squad by Milan's Christian Abbiati.

Sweden
Managers: Lars Lagerbäck and Tommy Söderberg

Turkey
Manager: Mustafa Denizli

Group C

FR Yugoslavia
Manager: Vujadin Boškov

Norway
Manager: Nils Johan Semb

Slovenia
Manager: Srečko Katanec

Spain
Manager: José Antonio Camacho

Group D

Czech Republic
Manager: Jozef Chovanec

Denmark
Manager:  Bo Johansson

France
Manager: Roger Lemerre

Netherlands
Manager: Frank Rijkaard

References

External links
RSSSF

Squads
2000